Chlorurus bowersi, Bower's parrotfish or the orange-blotch parrotfish, is a species of ray-finned fish, a parrotfish from the family Scaridae. It is found in the Western Pacific Ocean from the Ryukyu Islands of Japan in the north to Java, Papua and the Philippines in the south, and east to Micronesia. This species is found in reef flats and fronts in sheltered areas or where there is moderate exposure to the currents or waves. This is a relatively small parrotfish generally found in pairs which excavates burrows. It feeds on filamentous algae. Chlorurus bowersi was first formally described as Callyodon bowersi in 1909 by the American ichthyologist John Otterbein Snyder (1867-1943) and the type locality was given as Naha, Okinawa, Japan.

Etymology
The specific name honours the former United States Commissioner of Fisheries George Meade Bowers (1863-1925).

References

External links
 

bowersi
Taxa named by John Otterbein Snyder
Fish described in 1909